The 2013 Aaron's 499 was a NASCAR Sprint Cup Series stock car race that was held on May 5, 2013, at Talladega Superspeedway in Talladega, Alabama, United States. Contested over 192 laps on the 2.66–mile (4.28 km) tri-oval, it was the tenth race of the 2013 NASCAR Sprint Cup Series season. David Ragan of Front Row Motorsports won the race, his second career Sprint Cup win. Teammate David Gilliland finished second, while Carl Edwards, Michael Waltrip, and Jimmie Johnson rounded out the Top 5.

The race weekend was marred by rain, with qualifying being rained out. During the race, the event was stopped for three hours due to the weather at the track. Edwards, Johnson and Matt Kenseth battled for the win, but on the green–white–checker finish, Ragan and Gilliland claimed the lead during the final lap.

Report

Background

The track's turns are banked  at 33 degrees, while the front stretch, the location of the finish line, is 18 degrees. The back stretch, opposite of the front, is at only two degrees. The racetrack has a seating capacity for 109,000 spectators. Brad Keselowski was the defending race winner after winning the event during the 2012 race.

Before the race, Jimmie Johnson was leading the Drivers' Championship with 343 points, while Carl Edwards stood in second with 300 points. Kasey Kahne and Dale Earnhardt Jr. followed in the third and fourth position with 297 points each, seven ahead of Clint Bowyer in fifth. Keselowski, with 284, was in sixth; six points ahead of Kyle Busch. Eighth-placed Greg Biffle was one point ahead of Kevin Harvick and Paul Menard in ninth and tenth, and fourteen ahead of Aric Almirola in eleventh. Jamie McMurray completed the first twelve positions with 245 points.  In the Manufacturers' Championship, Chevrolet was leading with 64 points, five points ahead of Toyota. Ford was third after recording only 43 points during the first nine races.

There were 45 cars on the initial entry list, though it was reduced to 44 after Mike Bliss withdrew. All but four teams had entered the first nine races of the season; Elliott Sadler was attempting his second race of the season, Trevor Bayne was attempting his third, while Scott Speed (six) and Michael McDowell (eight) were also part-timers attempting the race. Sadler had to qualify for the race on speed due to being too low in owners points.

Practice and qualifying

Two practice sessions were held in preparation for the race; both on Friday, May 3. The first session lasted for 45 minutes, while second session was 60 minutes long.  During the first practice session, Edwards, for the Roush Fenway Racing team, was quickest ahead of Truex Jr. in second and Marcos Ambrose in third. Joey Logano was scored fourth, and Ryan Newman managed fifth. Matt Kenseth was sixth, while Denny Hamlin and his relief driver Brian Vickers were scored seventh. Johnson. Jeff Gordon, and Kahne rounded out the top ten quickest drivers in the session.

Keselowski was quickest in the second and final practice session, ahead of David Stremme in second and Kahne in third. Almirola was fourth quickest, and Travis Kvapil took fifth. Tony Stewart, Gordon, McMurray, Bobby Labonte, and Edwards followed in the top ten.

Qualifying was affected by wet weather soaking the track, therefore canceling the session and making first practice times determine the qualifying grid. Edwards, after finishing the first practice in first, was rewarded the pole position. He was joined on the front row of the grid by Truex Jr. Ambrose was third, Logano took fourth, and Newman started fifth. Kenseth, Hamlin, Johnson, Gordon and Kahne rounded out the first ten positions. The only driver who failed to qualify for the race was Elliott Sadler.

Race summary
The green flag flew at 12:10 PM CDT (1:10 PM EST) Martin Truex Jr. led the first five laps, but Matt Kenseth took the lead on lap six to begin his domination of the race. The first caution flew for fluid on the track on lap 23 after Trevor Bayne had blown an engine. During pit stops, Denny Hamlin climbed out of his car to surrender the rest of his day to Brian Vickers. Under NASCAR rules, Hamlin started the race and was credited with any results earned.

The second caution flew on lap 43 for The Big One: which occurred when Kyle Busch touched Kasey Kahne entering turn 1, and collected an additional twelve cars, including Truex, Vickers, Kevin Harvick, Tony Stewart, Jamie McMurray, Greg Biffle, Marcos Ambrose, Jeff Burton, David Stremme, Kurt Busch, David Reutimann, Casey Mears, Scott Speed, Clint Bowyer and Jeff Gordon. After the crash, Kyle Busch stated, "I was trying to go to the outside of him, but he just moved up in front of me and I wasn't expecting it. I tried to go to the outside of him and before I could get to the outside of him, I got in the back of him."

Matt Kenseth continued to lead most of this stretch, with Jimmie Johnson close behind in second. On lap 124, the third caution flew for rain. Just before the caution, Kenseth and Johnson had been shuffled back by Ricky Stenhouse Jr. and his teammate Carl Edwards. Edwards made a move for the lead and beat Stenhouse by one-half-an-inch for the lead when the third yellow came out. As the rain quickly intensified over the speedway, the red flag flew for 3 hours and 36 minutes as the track was dried. The initial shower was brief, but just as the track was almost dried, a heavier thunderstorm soaked the speedway.

Hours later after the track was dried, the restart began and Kenseth regained the lead. The race ran green through a round of green-flag pit stops. Johnson took the lead after pit stops, hoping to become the first driver since himself in 2006 to win the Daytona 500 and the spring Talladega race in the same year. Kenseth, who had the best car, was in the mix as well, along with Edwards, Kurt Busch, Michael Waltrip, and Bowyer in a six-car breakaway. The fourth caution then came out on lap 175 when Michael McDowell hit the wall in turn 2.

With ten laps left in the race, darkness was creeping in. On lap 182, the fifth caution of the race came out for a large crash on the backstretch. It started when Ricky Stenhouse Jr. tried to squeeze between the outside wall and J. J. Yeley. Yeley got loose, shot across the track, turned across the front of Marcos Ambrose and into the right-rear of Kurt Busch, collecting another ten cars, including Ryan Newman, Danica Patrick, Terry Labonte, Clint Bowyer, McMurray, Bobby Labonte, Waltrip, David Stremme, Truex and Gordon. Busch took the worst hit as his car turned sideways, flipped over once and landed on top of Newman, then was struck by Bobby Labonte and Bowyer after landing back on the ground. It marked the first time the Gen-6 car had rolled over. When interviewed Newman angrily said to reporters that NASCAR should not have ordered them to race in the dark conditions by saying that if they could not finish the race in daylight, they should call it official.

With two laps to go and with darkness imminent, NASCAR cancelled the three green-white-checker rule for the race and announced a decision to only have one attempt to finish under green, which it had also done the night before in the Nationwide race. On the restart, Kenseth, Johnson, and Edwards battled for the lead and their struggle allowed Front Row Motorsports drivers David Ragan and David Gilliland to slip by on the final lap. Ragan cleared the leaders in turn 3 and held off both Johnson, Gilliland, Edwards, and Michael Waltrip to take his second career win, his first since winning the 2011 Coke Zero 400. It was the first win in NASCAR for FRM. With Ragan's teammate Gilliland finishing 2nd, Front Row Motorsports earned a surprising 1–2 finish.

There were five cautions for 31 laps and 30 lead changes between 17 different drivers throughout the course of the race. The race took seven hours to complete.

Results

Qualifying

 Qualifying was canceled because of rain showers, prompting the grid to be set by first practice lap times.

Race results

Standings after the race

Drivers' Championship standings

Manufacturers' Championship standings

Note: Only the first twelve positions are included for the driver standings.

References

Aaron's 499
Aaron's 499
Aaron's 499
NASCAR races at Talladega Superspeedway